This is a list of lighthouses in Azerbaijan.

Lighthouses

See also 
 Lists of lighthouses and lightvessels

References

External links 

 

Azerbaijan
Lighthouses
Lighthouses